Car Dogs is a 2017 drama film which stars George Lopez, Dash Mihok, Patrick J. Adams, Octavia Spencer, and Josh Hopkins. The film is set in a car dealership where, in a single day, salesmen have to sell more cars than they ever have done.

Story
The story is set at the Chamberlain Auto Group which is run by Malcolm Chamberlain (played by Chris Mulkey). He has his son Mark working for him as the GM. Malcolm is a ruthless and manipulative car dealer. He offers his son a major part of a new store if he and the team of car salesmen can move 35 cars in a day, and they have to do it by 5pm. The sales manager (played by Josh Hopkins) has his eyes on the new dealership for himself and is playing dirty tricks behind Mark's back.

Background
The film came about as a result of Mark Edward King who was a student of Adam Collis. He wrote a short film script about car salesmen at a dealership who were trying to sell as many cars in a single day, more than they had ever done. King was encouraged by Collis to expand it into a script for a full feature. The film was made with the assistance of film students.

References

External links

American business films
Films about automobiles
Films about car dealerships
2016 films
2010s business films
2010s English-language films
2010s American films